"It's the Way You Make Me Feel" is a song by British dance-pop group Steps, released as their 12th single on 1 January 2001. It is the second track to be released from their third album, Buzz, and peaked at number two on the UK Singles Chart. This was the first song the band performed following their official reformation in October 2011. One of the single's B-sides, a cover of Marvin Gaye's "Too Busy Thinking About My Baby", was taken from the Motown Mania compilation.

Chart performance
This song debuted at number 72 on the UK Singles Chart on the final chart of 2000, as some record stores made the single available for purchase a week early. During that period, 1,400 sales were recorded. The following week, after it was properly released on New Year's Day 2001, the single set the record for the largest jump on the UK chart by leaping 70 places to number two, selling 53,400 copies. Steps held this record for eight years, until "Boys and Girls" by British singer Pixie Lott rose 72 places from number 73 to number one in September 2009. "It's the Way You Make Me Feel" stayed on the chart for nine more weeks and ended 2001 as the UK's 62nd-best-selling hit. Outside the UK, the track peaked at number eight in Ireland and number 32 in the Flanders region of Belgium.

Music video
The music video for the song featured the band members and supporting actors/dancers reenacting scenes from the movie Dangerous Liaisons. Band members H and Lee took turns playing Valmont, while Claire, Faye and Lisa took interchanging turns as the characters of Merteuil, Tourvel and Cécile.
The music video, including all internal and external shots, was shot at Brocket Hall near Welwyn Garden City in Hertfordshire.

Track listings

UK CD and cassette single
 "It's the Way You Make Me Feel" – 3:17
 "Too Busy Thinking About My Baby" – 2:49
 "In It for Love" – 3:23

European CD single
 "It's the Way You Make Me Feel" – 3:17
 "It's the Way You Make Me Feel" (Sleazesisters Anthem Edit) – 3:25

European maxi-CD single
 "It's the Way You Make Me Feel" – 3:17
 "It's the Way You Make Me Feel" (Sleaze Sisters 12-inch Anthem Mix) – 7:17
 "It's the Way You Make Me Feel" (Sleaze Sisters Anthem Edit) – 3:25
 "In It for Love – 3:27

Personnel

A-side: "It's the Way You Make Me Feel"
Credits are adapted from the liner notes of Buzz.

Recording
 Recorded at Cheiron Studios, Stockholm, Sweden, in 2000
 Mixed at Mono Studios, Stockholm, Sweden
 Mastered at Transfermation Studios, London

Vocals
 Lead vocals – Claire Richards, Faye Tozer, Lisa Scott-Lee, Ian "H" Watkins
 Background vocals – Lee Latchford-Evans

Personnel
 Songwriting – Jörgen Elofsson
 Production – David Kreuger, Jörgen Elofsson
 Mixing Engineer – Bernard Löör
 Strings – Stockholm Session Strings
 Keyboards – Patrik Andrën
 Guitar – Esbjörn Öhrwall
 Percussion – Gustave Lund

B-side: "Too Busy Thinking About My Baby"
Credits are adapted from the liner notes of "It's the Way You Make Me Feel".

Recording
 Recorded at PWL Studios, Manchester, in 2000
 Mixed at PWL Studios, Manchester
 Mastered at Transfermation Studios, London

Vocals
 Lead vocals – Claire Richards, Faye Tozer, Lisa Scott-Lee, Lee Latchford-Evans, Ian "H" Watkins

Personnel
 Songwriting – Norman Whitfield, Barrett Strong, Janie Bradford
 Production – Phil Nicholas, Lee Curle, Pete Waterman
 Mixing – Phil Nicholas, Lee Curle, Pete Waterman
 Engineer – Phil Nicholas, Lee Curle, Pete Waterman
 Keyboards – Karl Twigg
 Drums – Phil Nicholas
 Guitars – Greg Bone
 Bass – Phil Nicholas
 Piano – Phil Nicholas
 Strings – Simon Hale

Charts

Weekly charts

Year-end charts

Certifications

References

2000 songs
2001 singles
Jive Records singles
Pete Waterman Entertainment singles
Songs written by Jörgen Elofsson
Steps (group) songs
UK Independent Singles Chart number-one singles